Mount Pleasant Hospital was a health facility in Mount Pleasant, Swansea, Wales.

History
The facility had its origins in the Swansea Union Workhouse which was opened in 1862. A large female infirmary designed by Herbert Wills was added in 1903. It became Mount Pleasant Hospital in 1929 and joined the National Health Service in 1948. After services had transferred to Singleton Hospital, Mount Pleasant Hospital closed in 1995, the site was subsequently sold to Swansea Housing Association and the buildings were converted into accommodation for housing association tenants in 1999.

References

Defunct hospitals in Wales
Hospitals established in 1862
Hospital buildings completed in 1862
1862 establishments in Wales
Hospitals in Swansea